Totaig (from Old Norse Topt-vík) is a small crofting settlement on the west coast of Loch Dunvegan on the Isle of Skye.

References

Populated places in the Isle of Skye